Old Oenia or Old Oinia was a town of ancient Acarnania, mentioned by Strabo in contradistinction to New Oenia, which was the town of Oeniadae. Its precise location is not known, but it was located between Oeniadae and Stratus.

References

Populated places in ancient Acarnania
Former populated places in Greece
Lost ancient cities and towns